Paropamisadae or Parapamisadae (Greek: Παροπαμισάδαι) was a satrapy of the Alexandrian Empire in modern Afghanistan and Pakistan, which largely coincided with the Achaemenid province of Parupraesanna. It consisted of the districts of Sattagydia (Bannu basin), Gandhara (Kabul, Peshawar, and Taxila), and Oddiyana (Swat Valley). Paruparaesanna is mentioned in the Akkadian language and Elamite language versions of the Behistun Inscription of Darius the Great, whereas in the Old Persian version it is called Gandāra. The entire satrapy was subsequently ceded by Seleucus I Nicator to Chandragupta Maurya following a treaty.

Name
Paropamisadae is the Latinized form of the Greek name Paropamisádai, which is in turn derived from Old Persian Para-uparisaina, meaning "Beyond the Hindu Kush", where the Hindu Kush is referred to as Uparisaina ("higher than the eagle").

In the Greek language and Latin, "Paropamisus" (Paropamisós) came to mean the Hindu Kush.
In many Greek and Latin sources, particularly editions of Ptolemy's Geography where their realm is included on the 9th Map of Asia, the names of the people and region are given as Paropanisadae and Paropanisus. They also appeared less frequently as Parapamisadae and Parapamīsus (Parapámisos), Paropamīsii, etc.

The name was also applied to a nearby river, probably the Obi river. The mountain range Selseleh-ye Safīd Kūh is also called Paropamisus or Paropamisus Mountains.

Geography and peoples

Strabo describes the region as follows:

Thus the region was north of Arachosia, stretching up to the Hindu Kush and Pamir mountains, and bounded in the east by the Indus river. It mainly included the Kabul region, Gandhara and the northern regions such as Swat and Chitral.

The nations who composed the Paropamisadae are recorded as the Cabolitae in the north near modern Kabul; the Parsii (Πάρσιοι) in the northwest, the Ambautae in the east and the Par(g)yetae in the south, who were also found in Arachosia. The major cities of the land were the city of Ortospana or Carura (Κάρουρα), probably identifiable with Kabul, Gauzaca (Γαύζακα), probably modern Ghazni, Capissa (Καπίσσα), modern-day Kapisa, and Parsia (Παρσία), the capital of the Parsii.

History

In the ancient Buddhist texts, the Mahajanapada kingdom of Kamboja compassed the territories of Paropamisus and extended to the southwest of Kashmir as far as Rajauri. The region came under Achaemenid Persian control in the late 6th century BC, either during the reign of Cyrus the Great or Darius I.

In the 320s BC, Alexander the Great conquered the entire Achaemenid Empire, beginning the Hellenistic period. The Greek name Παροπαμισάδαι or Παροπαμισσός was used extensively in Greek literature to describe the conquests of Alexander and those of the kings of the Greco-Bactrian Kingdom and the Indo-Greek Kingdom, from the 3rd to the 1st centuries BC.

After Alexander's death in 323 BC, the area came under control of the Seleucid Empire, which gave the region to the Mauryan Dynasty of India in 305 BC. After the fall of the Mauryans in 185 BC, the Greco-Bactrians under King Demetrius I annexed the northwestern regions of the former Mauryan Empire, including Paropamisus, and it became part of his Euthydemid Indo-Greek Kingdom. The Eucratidians seized the area soon after the death of Menander I, but lost it to the Yuezhi around 125 BC.

See also
Indo-Greek kingdom
Greco-Bactrian kingdom

References

Citations

Bibliography
 
 The Greeks in Bactria and India by W.W. Tarn, Cambridge University Press

External links
 Ptolemy's section on the Paropanisadae in English translation
 John Watson McCrindle's Ancient India as Described in Ptolemy

States and territories established in the 6th century BC
States and territories disestablished in the 2nd century BC
Achaemenid satrapies
Ancient Greek geography
Geographic history of Afghanistan
Hazarajat
History of Pakistan
Macedonian Empire